The Mad House F4 is a closed-wheel sports prototype race car, used in the Fuji Grand Champion sports car racing series, in 1989. Based on the Lola T88/50 Formula 3000 car, it was powered by a Mugen MF308  V8 engine, and ran on Yokohama tires.

References 

Sports prototypes
Sports racing cars